Kurungalur is a village in the Thanjavur taluk of Thanjavur district, Tamil Nadu, India.

Demographics 

As per the 2001 census, Kurungalur had a total population of 1120 with 568 males and  558 females. The sex ratio was 972. The literacy rate was 76.9.

References 

 

Villages in Thanjavur district